The 1978–79 season was the 106th season of competitive football in Scotland and the 82nd season of Scottish league football.

Scottish Premier Division

Champions: Celtic 
Relegated: Hearts, Motherwell

Scottish League First Division

Promoted: Dundee, Kilmarnock
Relegated: Montrose, Queen of the South

Scottish League Second Division

Promoted: Berwick Rangers, Dunfermline Athletic

Cup honours

Other honours

National

County

 – aggregate over two legs – replay – won on penalties

Highland League

Individual honours

Scotland national team

1979 British Home Championship – Third Place

Key:
(H) = Home match
(A) = Away match
ECQG2 = European Championship qualifying – Group 2
BHC = British Home Championship

Notes and references

External links
Scottish Football Historical Archive

 
Seasons in Scottish football